During the 2008–09 season AFC Ajax participated in the Eredivisie, the KNVB Cup and the UEFA Cup. The first training took place on Monday July 14, 2008. The traditional AFC Ajax Open Day was on Tuesday August 5, 2008, followed by a testimonial match for the retired former Ajax defender Jaap Stam.

Pre-season
The first training for the 2008–09 season was held on July 14, 2008. In preparation for the new season Ajax organized a training camp in De Lutte, Netherlands at the De Thij Sportpark. During the pre-season, the squad from manager Marco van Basten played friendly matches against VV Noordwijk, CVV Germanicus and Excelsior '31 before traveling to the United Kingdom to play against Cardiff City and Sunderland, then traveling to Spain to play Real Murcia. They then returned to Amsterdam to play Arsenal and Internazionale in the annual Amsterdam Tournament.

Player statistics 
Appearances for competitive matches only

|-
|colspan="14"|Players sold or loaned out after the start of the season:

|}
As of 31 October 2011

2008-09 selection by nationality

Team statistics

Eredivisie standings 2008-09

Points by match day

Total points by match day

Standing by match day

Goals by match day

Statistics for the 2008-09 season
This is an overview of all the statistics for played matches in the 2008-09 season.

2008-09 team records

Top scorers

Placements

 Luis Suárez is voted Player of the year by the supporters of AFC Ajax.
 Gregory van der Wiel is voted Talent of the year by the supporters of AFC Ajax.

Results
All times are in CEST

Eredivisie

KNVB Cup

UEFA Cup

First round

Group stage

Final phase

Round of 32

Round of 16

Amsterdam Tournament 

Final standings of the LG Amsterdam Tournament 2008

Friendlies

Transfers for 2008-09

Summer transfer window
For a list of all Dutch football transfers in the summer window (1 July 2008 to 1 September 2008) please see List of Dutch football transfers summer 2008.

Arrivals 
 The following players moved to AFC Ajax.

Departures 
 The following players moved from AFC Ajax.

Winter transfer window 
For a list of all Dutch football transfers in the winter window (1 January 2009 to 1 February 2009) please see List of Dutch football transfers winter 2008–09.

Arrivals 
 The following players moved to AFC Ajax.

Departures 
 The following players moved from AFC Ajax.

External links 
Ajax Amsterdam Official Website in Nederlandse
UEFA Website

Ajax
AFC Ajax seasons